The Grand Mosque of Niamey is an Islamic mosque located in Niamey, Niger. It was built in the 1970s. The largest mosque in the city, it is located along Islam Avenue. The building was funded with money from Libya. It features a minaret with 171 steps from top to bottom.

See also
  Lists of mosques 
  List of mosques in Africa

References

Buildings and structures in Niamey
Mosques in Niger
Mosques completed in the 1970s